Flagship is an American rock band from Charlotte, North Carolina.  Formed in 2011, the group consists of Drake Margolnick (vocals, guitar) and Michael Finster (drums).

History

The band is a combination of two earlier Charlotte acts: Campbell the Band and Margolnick's solo work. In late 2011, the band signed to Bright Antenna Records.

The band toured with The Wombats in spring 2012. Reviewers noted the band's "power and emotion," coupled with their songs' "dreamlike quality."

On May 8, 2012 the band released their debut EP entitled blackbush available on iTunes and as a physical CD available at shows.

Flagship's self-titled debut album was released on October 8, 2013. The first song off the new album "Are You Calling" was premiered in a lyric video on the website Metrolyrics on July 12, 2013.

Band members
Drake Margolnick – vocals, guitar
Michael Finster – drums

Discography

Studio albums
Flagship (Bright Antenna, October 8, 2013)
The Electric Man (Bright Antenna, March 10, 2016)

Extended plays
blackbush EP (Bright Antenna, May 8, 2012)
Faded EP (Bright Antenna, July 10, 2015)

References

External links

Bio at Bright Antenna Records

Musical groups from North Carolina
Bright Antenna Records artists